Economic Forum is an annual international meeting of economic and political elites held in the first half of September[1] in the ski and spa resort of Karpacz in south-western Poland. The Forum was founded by Zygmunt Berdychowski in 1992 and it is organised by the Foundation Institute for Eastern Studies in Warsaw. Between 1992–2019 it was held in Krynica-Zdrój.
Within almost 30 years of its history the Economic Forum has evolved from a small conference, with about 100 participants, to one of the biggest and most recognisable meetings of the political and business leaders of Central and Eastern Europe, and is therefore  sometimes referred to as the "Eastern Davos".

According to the organisers, the mission of the Economic Forum is to create a favorable climate for development of political and economic cooperation in Europe. The opinions of the Forum's speakers are often quoted by the international media and discussed by leading analysts.

Guests 
The Forum engages political, business and third sector leaders, i.a.: presidents, prime ministers, ministers, EU commissioners, parliamentarians, presidents of large companies, experts, as well as representatives of cultural institutions and media. The 29th edition of the Economic Forum in 2019 was attended by 4,500 visitors from 60 countries in Europe, Asia and the Americas.
The following speakers have attended the Forum over the years, among others:

Valdas Adamkus, José María Aznar, Gordon Bajnai, José Manuel Barroso, Marek Belka, Elmar Brok, Jerzy Buzek, Emil Constantinescu, Massimo D'Alema, Norman Davis, Valdis Dombrovskis, Roland Dumas, Andrzej Duda, Mikuláš Dzurinda, Robert Fico, Vladimir Filat, Jan Fisher, Kolinda Grabar-Kitarović, Alfred Gusenbauer, Dalia Grybauskaitė, Rebecca Harms, Václav Havel, Danuta Hübner, Toomas Hendrik Ilves, Ǵorge Iwanow, Arseniy Yatsenyuk, Viktor Yanukovych, Sergey Yastrzhembsky, Viktor Yushchenko, Jarosław Kaczyński, Ewa Kopacz, Aleksander Kwaśniewski, Bronisław Komorowski, Gediminas Kirkilas, Horst Kohler, Milan Kučan, Vytautas Landsbergis, Thomas de Maizière, Stjepan Mesić, Mario Monti, Leszek Miller, Viktor Orbán, Andris Piebalgs, Petro Poroshenko, Viviane Reding, Mikheil Saakashvili, Jorge Sampaio, Karel Schwarzenberg, Bohuslav Sobotka, László Sólyom, Beata Szydło, Boris Tadić, Mirek Topolánek, Sviatlana Tsikhanouskaya, Donald Tusk, Vaira Vīķe-Freiberga, Lech Wałęsa, José Luis Zapatero, Amanda Zuffi.

Debates 

Over 200 debates and discussion panels are held annually during the Forum. They are grouped in the following theme paths:
 Business and Management
Europe and the World
Healthcare Forum
 Investments Forum
 Innovations Forum
 International Politics
New Economy
 Regions' Forum
Society
Sustainable Development

Media 
The Forum is regularly covered by journalists from major international media outlets. The debates and discussion panels have been covered by Bloomberg, AFP, Reuters, ANSA or TASS, and by leading daily newspapers such as: Die Welt, Frankfurter Allgemeine Zeitung, Le Figaro, Euronews, Kommersant, Financial Times and The Wall Street Journal.

References

External links 
 Official website

Economy of Europe
Eastern Europe